Michal Sadílek (born 31 May 1999) is a Czech professional footballer who plays as a midfielder for Eredivisie club Twente. He represents the  Czech Republic national team.

Club career
He made his professional debut in the Eerste Divisie for Jong PSV on 4 November 2016 in a game against Helmond Sport.

On 7 August 2021, he joined FC Twente on loan. On 19 April 2022, the deal was made permanent as he signed a two-year contract.

Honours
Individual
Toulon Tournament Best XI: 2017

International career
Sadílek represented Czech Republic at all youth levels. On 4 June 2021, he debuted with the senior Czech Republic national team in a friendly 4–0 loss to Italy.

Personal life
His brother Lukáš is also a professional footballer.

References

External links
 
 
 National team statistics at fotbal.cz 

1999 births
Living people
People from Uherské Hradiště
Association football midfielders
Czech footballers
Czech Republic youth international footballers
Czech Republic under-21 international footballers
Czech Republic international footballers
Jong PSV players
PSV Eindhoven players
FC Slovan Liberec players
FC Twente players
Eredivisie players
Eerste Divisie players
Czech First League players
UEFA Euro 2020 players
Czech expatriate footballers
Czech expatriate sportspeople in the Netherlands
Expatriate footballers in the Netherlands
Sportspeople from the Zlín Region